This is a list of Imperial German artillery regiments before and during World War I. In peacetime, the Imperial German Army included 100 regiments of Field artillery (plus the Lehr instruction unit) and 24 regiments of Foot artillery (plus another Lehr instruction unit) who operated the heavier pieces. Some of these regiments had a history stretching back to the 17th Century, while others were only formed as late as October 1912.

Field Artillery Regiments

Foot Artillery Regiments

See also 

Bavarian Army
German Army (German Empire)
List of Imperial German infantry regiments
List of Imperial German cavalry regiments

References

Bibliography 
 
 
 

 
 
German
Imperial German artillery regiments